The Vagabond (Spanish:El vagabundo) is a 1953 Mexican comedy film directed by Rogelio A. González and Gilberto Martínez Solares and starring Germán Valdés, Leonor Llausás and Wolf Ruvinskis.

Cast
 Germán Valdés 
 Leonor Llausás 
 Wolf Ruvinskis 
 Marcelo Chávez 
 Aurora Segura 
 Felipe Montoya 
 Georgina González 
 José Ortiz de Zárate 
 José Ortega 
 Francisco Pando 
 Emilio Garibay 
 Enrique Carrillo 
 José Chávez 
 Jesús Gómez 
 Manuel Trejo Morales 
 Ramón Valdés 
 Rodolfo Calvo 
Diana Ochoa
 León Barroso 
 Rogelio Fernández 
 Leonor Gómez 
 Paco Martínez 
 Ignacio Peón 
 Joaquín Roche 
 Humberto Rodríguez 
 Pepe Ruiz Vélez

References

Bibliography 
 Baugh, Scott L. Latino American Cinema: An Encyclopedia of Movies, Stars, Concepts, and Trends. ABC-CLIO, 2012.

External links 
 

1953 films
1953 comedy films
Mexican comedy films
1950s Spanish-language films
Films directed by Gilberto Martínez Solares
Films directed by Rogelio A. González
Films scored by Manuel Esperón
Mexican black-and-white films
1950s Mexican films